Dinosaur training is a philosophy of weight training / physical culture promoting a return to traditional strongman types of exercises and training.

Overview
Dinosaur training positions itself in opposition to aerobics exercise culture and to bodybuilding and other training methods geared towards cosmetic purposes. It stresses intensity, hard work, functional strength, power, endurance and mental toughness.

Dinosaur training methodologies have been disseminated through the training manuals written by Brooks D. Kubik, although Bob Whelan, Ken Leistner, and John McCallum are counted as proponents of similar training methods. Historical lifters like Peary Rader and various late 19th-century and early 20th-century strongmen and physical culture proponents such as Eugen Sandow are regarded as being inspiration of dinosaur training styles.

Kubik's book Dinosaur Training became highly acclaimed by the weight-lifting community. It offered simple yet effective routines, which were in stark contrast to complex routines offered by many authors within the fitness industry. Kubiks books are written in a motivational style, with an edge of humour.

For a time Kubik advocated Dinosaur Training using bodyweight exercises, as described in his book Dinosaur Bodyweight Training (2006), using such exercises as pushups, handstand pushups, pullups, neck bridges, hanging leg raises, and two- and one-legged deep knee bends. In recent years however he has returned to writing about and advocating traditional weightlifting modes of training, using such exercises as squats, deadlifts, powercleans, high pulls, military presses, barbell bentover rows, benchpresses, etc. for low to moderate reps. 

Kubik elaborated further on the principles of Dinosaur training literally in a novel format in 2008's "Legacy of Iron," which told the story of a young man being tutored in basic "old school" training and manhood by the lifters of York Barbell.  

The primary texts describing the Dinosaur Training philosophy are Dinosaur Training (1996; 2nd edition, 1998), written by Brooks D. Kubik; Dinosaur Bodyweight Training (2006), written by Brooks D. Kubik; and the Dinosaur Files newsletter, published by Kubik from August 1997 to August 2002, then resurrected, with revisions and updates, in 2006; and Legacy of Iron (2008), written by Brooks D. Kubik. Ironman's Ultimate Guide To Building Muscle Mass includes a chapter by Kubik on Dinosaur Training.

See also
Bench press
Deadlift
Squat
Powerlifting

References

External links
Dinosaur Training website

Strength training writers
Weight training methodologies